Edaphaspis bystrowi is an extinct amphiaspidid cyathaspidid heterostracan. Its fossils are restricted to early Devonian-aged marine strata of the Taimyr Peninsula, Early Devonian Siberia.  E. bystrowi, as with all other amphiaspidids, is thought to have been a benthic filter feeder that lived on top of, or buried just below the surface of the substrate of hypersaline lagoon-bottoms.  It is the only representative of the family Edaphaspididae.

Anatomy
E. bystrowi is known from a mostly complete cephalothoracic armor that is 16 centimeters long, and 21 centimeters wide.  The armor is laterally flanked on both sides by serrated fringes.  The anterior portion of the armor is missing, so experts are unsure if E. bystrowi had eyes (and preorbital openings) or not.  There is a pair of branchial openings placed dorsally on a large dorsal lump at the posterior end of the armor.

References

Amphiaspidida
Devonian jawless fish
Early Devonian fish
Cyathaspidiformes genera
Devonian fish of Asia
Fauna of Siberia
Fossils of Russia
Early Devonian first appearances
Devonian extinctions